Daniel Dean Hughes (born April 14, 1955) is an American basketball coach who most recently coached Seattle Storm of the Women's National Basketball Association (WNBA) from 2018 until his retirement in 2021. He has guided stars such as Sue Bird, Natasha Howard, Mercedes Russell, and Jordin Canada.

Hughes coached the Silver Stars from 2005 to 2009, and rejoined the team in 2011. Prior to the 2013 season, Hughes signed a multiyear contract extension. He has coached the most victories in franchise history. On April 19, 2016, the Stars announced that Hughes would step down as general manager and head coach following the 2016 season.

Coaching record 

|-
| align="left" | CHA
| align="left" | 1999
| 20||10||10|||| align="center" | 2nd in East||4||2||2||
| align="center" | Lost in Eastern Conference Finals
|-
| align="left" | CLE
| align="left" | 2000
| 32||17||15|||| align="center" | 2nd in East||6||3||3||
| align="center" | Lost in Eastern Conference Finals
|-
| align="left" | CLE
| align="left" | 2001
| 32||22||10|||| align="center" | 1st in East||3||1||2||
| align="center" | Lost in Eastern Conference Semi-Finals
|-
| align="left" | CLE
| align="left" | 2002
| 32||10||22|||| align="center" | 7th in East||–||–||–||–
| align="center" | Missed Playoffs
|-
| align="left" | CLE
| align="left" | 2003
| 34||17||17|||| align="center" | 4th in East||3||1||2||
| align="center" | Lost in Eastern Conference Semi-Finals
|-
| align="left" | SAS
| align="left" | 2005
| 34||7||27|||| align="center" | 7th in West||–||–||–||–
| align="center" | Missed Playoffs
|-
| align="left" | SAS
| align="left" | 2006
| 34||13||21|||| align="center" | 6th in West||–||–||–||–
| align="center" | Missed Playoffs
|-
| align="left" | SAS
| align="left" | 2007
| 34||20||14|||| align="center" | 2nd in West||5||2||3||
| align="center" | Lost in Western Conference Finals
|-
| align="left" | SAS
| align="left" | 2008
| 34||24||10|||| align="center" | 1st in West||9||4||5||
| align="center" | Lost in WNBA Finals
|-
| align="left" | SAS
| align="left" | 2009
| 34||15||19|||| align="center" | 4th in West||3||1||2||
| align="center" | Lost in Western Conference Semi-Finals
|-
| align="left" | SAS
| align="left" | 2011
| 34||18||16|||| align="center" | 4th in West||3||1||2||
| align="center" | Lost in Western Conference Semi-Finals
|-
| align="left" | SAS
| align="left" | 2012
| 34||21||13|||| align="center" | 3rd in West||2||0||2||
| align="center" | Lost in Western Conference Semi-Finals
|-
| align="left" | SAS
| align="left" | 2013
| 34||12||22|||| align="center" | 5th in West||–||–||–||–
| align="center" | Missed Playoffs
|-
| align="left" | SAS
| align="left" | 2014
| 34||16||18|||| align="center" | 4th in West||2||0||2||
| align="center" | Lost in Western Conference Semi-Finals
|-
| align="left" | SAS
| align="left" | 2015
| 34||8||26|||| align="center" | 6th in West||–||–||–||–
| align="center" | Missed Playoffs
|-
| align="left" | SAS
| align="left" | 2016
| 34||7||27|||| align="center" | 6th in West||–||–||–||–
| align="center" | Missed Playoffs
|-  ! style="background:#FDE910;"
| align="left" | SEA
| align="left" | 2018
| 34||26||8|||| align="center" | 1st in West||8||6||2||
| style="text-align:center;" | Won WNBA Championship
|-
| align="left" | SEA
| align="left" | 2019
| 34||18||16|||| align="center" | 3rd in West||2||1||1||
| style="text-align:center;" | Lost in 2nd Round
|-
| align="left" | SEA
| align="left" | 2021
| 6||5||1|||| align="center" | (retired)||–||–||–||–
| style="text-align:center;" | 
|- class="sortbottom"
| align="left" | Career
| ||598||286||312|||| ||50||22||28||

References

External links 
 Dan Hughes Biography from WNBA.com

1955 births
Living people
American men's basketball players
American women's basketball coaches
Basketball coaches from Ohio
Charlotte Sting coaches
Cleveland Rockers coaches
Miami University alumni 
Muskingum Fighting Muskies baseball players
Muskingum Fighting Muskies men's basketball players
San Antonio Stars coaches
University of Mount Union
Women's National Basketball Association executives
Seattle Storm coaches
Women's National Basketball Association championship-winning head coaches
Women's National Basketball Association general managers
People from Washington County, Ohio